Kurmaiyan is an Indian Punjabi movie directed by Gurmeet Saajan and Manjit Singh Tony. Kurmayian movie starring Harjit Harman and Japji Khaira as the main protagonists of the film. Movie was released worldwide on 14 September 2018.

Cast
 Harjit Harman ... Harjeet
 Japji Khaira ... Paali 
 Gurmeet Saajan ... Master Joginder Singh 'Joga'
 Anita Devgun ... Dhann Kaur- Harjeet's Bhua
 Hardeep Gill ... Dhann Kaur - Harjeet's Phufad
 Nirmal Rishi ... Ambo Jai Kaur
 Harby Sangha ... Mitha Singh Vichola 
 Hobby Dhaliwal
 Rakhi Hundal ... Charno
 Veet Baljit ... Charno's Husband 
 Parminder Gill ਪਰਮਿੰਦਰ ਗਿੱਲ ... Surjeet Kaur- Harjeet's mother

Track listing

References

External links
 
  Kurmaiyan Movie Trailer
Punjabi-language Indian films
2010s Punjabi-language films
Indian comedy-drama films
Indian family films